Gorgabad (also Romanized as Gorgābād; also known as Sa‘īdābād) is a village in Sanjabad-e Jonubi Rural District, Firuz District, Kowsar County, Ardabil Province, Iran. At the 2006 census, its population was 82, in 14 families.

References 

Towns and villages in Kowsar County